Anthaxia croesus is a species of jewel beetle belonging to the family Buprestidae, subfamily Buprestinae.

Taxonomy
A group of specialists (V. Kuban, D. Baiocchi, S. Bíly, T. Kwast and M. Kafka) has ascertained the true identity of the species described by Villers 50 years before the description of Gené, Consequently, this species has to be interpreted as Anthaxia (Haplanthaxia) croesus (de Villers, 1789) = Anthaxia (Haplanthaxia) scutellaris Gené, 1839. The latter epithet passed to junior synonym.

Subspecies
Subspecies include:
Anthaxia croesus atlasica Théry, 1930
Anthaxia croesus croesus (Villers, 1789

Distribution and habitat

This beetle is present in Albania, Croatia, France, Italy, Greece, Portugal, Spain and in North Africa (Morocco). It occurs on meadows, pastures and riparian forests.

Description
The adults of Anthaxia croesus can reach a length of about 5–6 mm. Their body shows metallic blue, green and purple colours.

Biology
Adults can be encountered from April through July, lying above the daisies, but also on flowers of Umbelliferae and other flowers. The larva is polyphagous and lives at the expense of several shrubs and trees. Main larval host plants are in the genera Arbutus, Ceratonia, Cornus, Juniperus, Malus, Pinus, Pistacia, Prunus, Pyrus, Quercus, Salix and Spartium.

References

Buprestidae
Beetles of Europe
Beetles described in 1789